The 1978 Camel GT Challenge season was the 8th season of the IMSA GT Championship auto racing series.  It was the first year of the new GTX class, which allowed for Group 5 cars to compete.  The GTO and GTU class Grand tourer cars remained from before.  It began February 4, 1978, and ended November 26, 1978, after fourteen rounds.

Schedule
Not all classes participated in some events.  Races marked with All had all classes on track at the same time.

Season results

External links
 World Sports Racing Prototypes - 1978 IMSA GT Championship results

IMSA GT Championship seasons
IMSA GT